General elections were held in Turkey on 6 November 1983, the first since 1977 after democratic rights were abandoned after the military coup of 1980. The National Security Council banned the previous political parties from participating, leading to the establishment of new parties. Turgut Özal's Motherland Party (ANAP) won a significant victory in this elections by gaining 45.14% of the votes. This victory was the starting point of a rapid change in the structure of the state and society in Turkey. Voter turnout was 76.6%.

The People's Party (HP) was the continuation of the former CHP and was the only left-wing participant in the election. The Nationalist Democracy Party was founded by the military junta of the time, whilst the Motherland Party was seen as the successor of the Justice Party (AP) by some circles but Süleyman Demirel, the leader of AP, who would later form the DYP to challenge the power of Turgut Özal's Motherland Party. With a first-ever televised debate on TRT, the elections brought a new factor into the political campaign. Necdet Calp was a long serving politician, Sunalp a high-ranking officer, and both had little to offer to confront Turgut Özal rhetorical skills.

Results
Owing to a registration error in the town of Bingöl, ANAP were unable to take one of the seats they had won there, lowering the total number of MPs in the chamber to 399.

References

Turkey
Turkey
General
General elections in Turkey